Martin Schwenk (also known as George Martin, March 10, 1832 – June 20, 1924) was a German-American soldier who fought in the American Civil War. Schwenk received his country's highest award for bravery during combat, the Medal of Honor. Schwenk's medal was awarded for bravery during the Battle of Gettysburg in Pennsylvania on 3 July 1863. He was honored with the award on April 23, 1889.

Schwenk was born in Baden in Germany and after emigrating to the United States, he entered service in Boston. He was buried at Arlington National Cemetery.

Medal of Honor citation

See also
 List of Medal of Honor recipients for the Battle of Gettysburg
 List of American Civil War Medal of Honor recipients: Q–S

References

1832 births
1924 deaths
American Civil War recipients of the Medal of Honor
People from Baden
People of Massachusetts in the American Civil War
Württemberger emigrants to the United States
Union Army officers
German-born Medal of Honor recipients
Burials at Arlington National Cemetery
United States Army Medal of Honor recipients